Groesbeek Canadian War Cemetery and Memorial (French:Le Cimetière de Guerre Canadien Groesbeek, Dutch:Canadese Oorlogsbegraafplaats Groesbeek) is a Second World War Commonwealth War Graves Commission military war grave cemetery, located in the village of Groesbeek,  southeast of Nijmegen in the Netherlands. Of the total 2,619 burials, the cemetery contains 2,338 Canadian soldiers. It was built to a design by Commission architect Philip Hepworth.

History
The cemetery is unique in that many of the dead were brought here from nearby Germany. It is one of the few cases where bodies were moved across international frontiers. It is believed that all fallen Canadian soldiers of the Rhineland battles, who were buried in German battlefields, were re-interred here (except for one who is buried in Reichswald Forest War Cemetery). General Crerar, who commanded Canadian land forces in Europe, ordered that Canadian dead were not to be buried in German soil.

The cemetery also has a Cross of Sacrifice within it.

Thousands of Dutch children tend the graves of the soldiers buried here as they do throughout the Netherlands.

Commemoration
Within the cemetery stands the Groesbeek Memorial, which commemorates members of the Commonwealth land forces who died during the campaign in north-west Europe between the time of crossing the Seine River at the end of August 1944 and the end of the war in Europe. There are 1,016 names on the memorial; although since the date of completion of the name-panels, graves have been found for four men commemorated by it. The Bayeux Memorial in Normandy, France honours 103 Canadian servicemen and women.

The memorial consists of twin colonnaded buildings which face each other across the grass forecourt of the cemetery, between the entrance and the "Stone of Remembrance." The names of the men whose graves are unknown are inscribed in panels of Portland stone built into the rear walls.

International Four Days Marches Nijmegen
On the third day of the International Four Days Marches Nijmegen, the route leads along the Canadian military cemetery, and the military participants commemorate their colleagues from the Second World War during an impressive ceremonial gathering.

Notable graves
Aubrey Cosens (1921–1945) of the Queen's Own Rifles of Canada VC 
John Baskeyfield (1922–1944) of the South Staffordshire Regiment VC is remembered on the memorial. 
Gustave Biéler, Frank Pickersgill and Roméo Sabourin, Canadian members of the Special Operations Executive who were sent undercover into occupied France; all three were caught by the Germans and sent to concentration camps, where they were executed. They are remembered on the memorial
Terrence Hicks GM (1920–1944) of the 1st Parachute Squadron, Corps of Royal Engineers is remembered on the memorial (Hicks was killed in action on 19 September 1944, aged 24, in the Marktstraat area of Arnhem and has no known grave). Awarded the GM for an act of conspicuous gallantry in Gibraltar in 1942.

Images

Nearby Commonwealth War Graves
Arnhem Oosterbeek War Cemetery
Jonkerbos War Cemetery
Mook War Cemetery

References

External links

 
 Government of Canada website for the Groesbeek Memorial
 
 British Pathe news clip of the dedication ceremony, held on 5 May 1947 at the cemetery's Cross of Sacrifice with Queen Wilhelmina of the Netherlands

Canadian military memorials and cemeteries
1945 establishments in the Netherlands
World War II memorials in the Netherlands
Commonwealth War Graves Commission cemeteries in the Netherlands
Cemeteries in the Netherlands
Cemeteries in Gelderland
Berg en Dal (municipality)
20th-century architecture in the Netherlands